Thomas Lawyer (October 14, 1785 in Schoharie, New York – May 21, 1868 in Lawyersville, Schoharie County, New York) was an American politician from New York.

Life
He studied law, was admitted to the bar and practiced in Schoharie County. He was a member of the New York State Assembly in 1816.

He was a brigadier general of the State militia.

Lawyer was elected as a Democratic-Republican to the 15th United States Congress, holding office from  March 4, 1817, to March 3, 1819. He was District Attorney of Schoharie County from 1822 to 1831. He was again a member of the State Assembly in 1846.

References

The New York Civil List compiled by Franklin Benjamin Hough (pages 70, 191, 232, 287 and 381; Weed, Parsons and Co., 1858)

1785 births
1868 deaths
People from Schoharie, New York
Members of the New York State Assembly
County district attorneys in New York (state)
American militia generals
Democratic-Republican Party members of the United States House of Representatives from New York (state)
People from Schoharie County, New York
19th-century American politicians